American rapper 50 Cent has released five studio albums, ten mixtapes, two video albums, four compilation albums, two soundtrack album, 76 singles (including 26 as a featured artist), and 88 music videos. As of July 2014, he is the sixth best-selling hip-hop artist of the Nielsen SoundScan era with 16,786,000 albums sold in the US. 50 Cent signed to Shady Records in 2002 and released his debut studio album, Get Rich or Die Tryin', on February 6, 2003. The album peaked at number one in the US Billboard 200 and performed well in international markets. It features the number-one singles "In da Club" and "21 Questions" and also includes the singles "P.I.M.P." and "If I Can't". 50 Cent collaborated with American rapper Lil' Kim on "Magic Stick", which peaked at number two in the US.

In 2005, he released his second studio album, The Massacre. The album charted at number one in the US, as well as reaching the top ten on many album charts worldwide, and sold 4.83 million copies in the United States in 2005, the second highest sales count by any album that year. The Massacre includes the US top-three hits "Disco Inferno" and "Just a Lil Bit", and the US number-one hit "Candy Shop", which peaked in the top ten of many charts worldwide. A reissue of The Massacre produced the single "Outta Control", which peaked at number six in the US. In November 2005, 50 Cent starred in the movie Get Rich or Die Tryin', and recorded four singles for the film's soundtrack: the international hits "Hustler's Ambition" and "Window Shopper", and also "Best Friend" and "I'll Whip Ya Head Boy".

In 2007, 50 Cent's third studio album, Curtis, debuted at number two on the Billboard 200, behind Kanye West's album Graduation, after a much-hyped sales competition between the albums. Five singles were released from the album, including international hit "Ayo Technology" and Billboard hits "Straight to the Bank", "Amusement Park", "I Get Money" and "I'll Still Kill". In 2009, he released his fourth studio album, Before I Self Destruct. Music critics described the album as a return to the darker, more intense style of music that 50 Cent exhibited on many of his early mixtapes. The album charted at number five on the Billboard 200 and peaked in the top twenty of several album charts worldwide. The album features two singles: the international hit "Baby by Me", which peaked at number twenty-eight in the US, and "Do You Think About Me".

In June 2014, 50 Cent released his fifth studio album, Animal Ambition. All of the songs on the standard edition of the album were released as singles prior to the album being delivered to the public. His shelved studio album, then-titled Street King Immortal, was preceded by the release of the non-album song "Outlaw", which peaked at number eighty-seven in both the US and Canada, and a free download album – 5 (Murder by Numbers) – on July 6, 2012. Four songs were released in promotion for Street King Immortal: "New Day", "My Life", which reached number two on the UK Singles Chart, "Major Distribution", and "We Up", but the songs were scrapped and the album has been delayed numerous times before officially being scrapped in July 2021.

Studio albums

Compilation albums

Soundtracks

Video albums

Mixtapes

Miscellaneous

See also 
 50 Cent singles discography
 G-Unit discography

References

External links 
 
 50 Cent at AllMusic
 
 

Hip hop discographies
Discographies of American artists